John McMahon (born 1949) is an Irish former hurler who played as a left corner-back for the Clare senior team.

McMahon first joined the Clare team in the early 1970s and was a regular member of the starting fifteen over the course of the next decade.  During that time he won two National Hurling League winners' medals and two All-Star awards, however, he missed out on a Munster winners' medal on a number of occasions.

At club level McMahon enjoyed a successful career with Newmarket-on-Fergus, winning one Munster winner's medal and nine county club championship winners' medals.

References

1949 births
Newmarket-on-Fergus hurlers
Clare inter-county hurlers
Munster inter-provincial hurlers
Living people